Ezra Millard  (February 2, 1833 – August 20, 1886) was a U.S. politician who was mayor of Omaha, Nebraska, from 1869 to 1871. He was also brother to Joseph Hopkins Millard, another mayor of Omaha, and namesake of Millard, Nebraska.

Millard died in Saratoga Springs, New York of heart complications in 1886. At the time of his death he was employed as the treasurer of the Omaha Cable Tramway Company.

References

 

1833 births
1886 deaths
Mayors of Omaha, Nebraska
Burials at Prospect Hill Cemetery (North Omaha, Nebraska)
Businesspeople from Omaha, Nebraska
19th-century American politicians
19th-century American businesspeople